Wola Rzeplińska  (Volia Riplyns’ka) is a village in the administrative district of Gmina Kańczuga, within Przeworsk County, Subcarpathian Voivodeship, in south-eastern Poland.

References

Villages in Przeworsk County